Akka or AKKA may refer to:

Arts and entertainment
 Akka (film), a 1976 Indian Tamil film
 Akka (TV series), a 2014–2015 Indian Tamil soap opera
 Akka, a character in the children's novel The Wonderful Adventures of Nils by Selma Lagerlöf
 AKKA, a fictional weapon in the Legion of Space Series by Jack Williamson

People
 Akka Mahadevi (12th century), Indian Kannada poet
 Lahcen Samsam Akka (born 1942), Moroccan shot putter
 Narmada Akka (died 2012), member of the Communist Party of India

Places
 Acre, Israel (Arabic: Akka), a city
 Akka, Morocco, a town
 Akka, Republic of Dagestan, Russia, a rural locality
 Áhkká, a mountain in Sweden

Ships
 MV Akka, a Swedish cargo ship
 SS Akka, a German (later Kriegsmarine) cargo ship

Other uses
 8034 Akka, a near-Earth asteroid
 AKKA, Association of Kannada Kootas of America, a nonprofit organization
 Akka (spirit), a Finnish goddess
 Akka (toolkit), a software development kit for Java

See also
 
 
 Acre (disambiguation)
 Aka (disambiguation)
 Akha (disambiguation)
 Akkas (name)
 Akkaş, a Turkish surname
 Akko (disambiguation)
 Melkite Greek Catholic Archeparchy of Akka
 Saint Jean d'Acre (disambiguation)
 Siege of Acre (disambiguation)